Balsam Creek is a stream in Itasca County, in the U.S. state of Minnesota. It is a tributary of the Prairie River.

Balsam Creek was named for the balsam fir trees in its vicinity.

See also
List of rivers of Minnesota

References

Rivers of Itasca County, Minnesota
Rivers of Minnesota